Manuel Ríos Fernández (born 17 December 1998), known professionally as Manu Ríos, is a Spanish actor and singer known for his role as Patrick Blanco Commerford on the Netflix series Elite.

He began his musical career in 2010 by performing covers on YouTube. In 2012, he joined the musical band Parchís, a group with which he released albums and went on tours. 

In April 2022, Ríos revealed to W Magazine that the working of his debut EP had halted due to filming Elite, but is excited to release his music in the near future.

Early life
Ríos was born on 17 December 1998 in Calzada de Calatrava. He began his career in the entertainment industry at the age of nine, when he participated in a reality show in Castilla-La Mancha. At that age, he also began uploading covers of famous songs on YouTube. He studied classical ballet and urban dance and was one of the members of the children's musical band Parchís in its 2012 relaunch, a group with which he released records and toured throughout Spain. In addition, he participated in a production of the musical Les Misérables, playing Gavroche.

Awards and Recognitions 
In 2021, Manu Rios has received his award for best actor in a television series awarded by the Hombres Esquire Awards by Esquire Magazine in Teatro Barcelo Theatre in Madrid, Spain.

Filmography

Series

Shorts

Theater

References

External links
 
 
Manu Rios at Instagram

Living people
Male actors from Castilla–La Mancha
Singers from Castilla–La Mancha
Spanish television actors
21st-century Spanish male actors
21st-century Spanish male singers
21st-century Spanish singers
1998 births
Spanish male models